Wild West C.O.W.-Boys of Moo Mesa is a 1992–1993 American animated television series created by comic book artist Ryan Brown, known for his work on Teenage Mutant Ninja Turtles. It aired as part of ABC's Saturday morning lineup.

It was produced by Greengrass Productions in association with King World Productions and was animated by Gunther-Wahl Productions for its first season, and Ruby-Spears Enterprises for its second season. At the time of launch, it was only the second animated series involving King World Productions to be broadcast (the other was the animated spin-off of The Little Rascals, which aired on ABC from 1982 to 1984).

First broadcast on September 12, 1992, the show ran for two seasons of thirteen episodes each. It also aired on YTV from 1992 to 1999 in Canada. The series was featured in reruns on Toon Disney from 1998 to 2001.

Plot
Wild West C.O.W.-Boys of Moo Mesa dealt with a mutation of some kind; an irradiated comet struck the late 19th century Western plains creating a miles high mesa shrouded in clouds. Everything trapped on top of the mesa was "cow-metized" by the light from the "cow-met" and "evolved" into a "bovipomorphic" state. Inspired by old tales of the Wild West, this new bovine community developed to the point where they emulated that era's way of life, including the requisite ruffians and corrupt sheriffs. However, their knowledge of Wild West living was limited, and as such, many things about their culture had to be improvised to 'fill in the blanks'. The concepts of steampunk and Weird West were utilized throughout its run.

The series focuses on trying to keep justice in the frontier territory. The lawbreakers were too much for the corrupt regulators of Cowtown (namely Mayor Oscar Bulloney and Sheriff Terrorbull) to handle by themselves. Helping them out, whether they wanted it or not, were a group of peacekeepers known as C.O.W.-Boys (the C.O.W. part is short for "Code of the West") led by Marshal Moo Montana, the C.O.W.-Boys also included the Dakota Dude and the Cowlorado Kid. Marshal Moo Montana and his deputies had their hands full with several ruffians and outlaw gangs that plagued the otherwise peaceful town.

Characters

C.O.W.-Boys
 Marshal Moo Montana (voiced by Pat Fraley) – the leader of the C.O.W.-Boys and the marshal of Moo Mesa. Courageous and quick on his hooves, Moo "battles the bad guys and makes the West a safer place to graze". Lives by the Code of the West, which he seems to make up as he goes along (as seen in the episode "The Big Cow Wow") he has a gun that shoots star-badges. Moo's horse's name is "Cyclone".
 Dakota Dude (voiced by Jim Cummings) – the soft-spoken muscle of Montana's posse, Dakota is calm and level-headed, as he rarely loses his temper, even in near-death experiences (as seen in "Dances with Bulls") and is scared of heights. Dakota agreed to marry Cowlamity Kate in Wedding Bull Blues to save her father's inheritance. Dakota's horse's name is "Rebel".
 Cowlorado Kid (voiced by Jeff Bennett) – a Holstein cattle bull who is the youngest of the group and a self-proclaimed ladies' man with a good singing voice, regardless of his skill with the lasso and guitar; also, Cowlorado isn't a deputy yet. In "Stolen on the River", he tries to prove he's worthy of being a deputy by catching Five Card Cud only to get in trouble and be rescued by Dakota and Moo. Cowlorado's horse's name is "Jezebel".

Supporting characters
 Lily Bovine (voiced by Charity James) – a bartender, former showgirl and the owner of the local saloon called The Tumbleweed where the C.O.W.-Boys go to enjoy some Sarsaparilla. Lily is Moo Montana's love interest. Her best friend is Cowlamity Kate.
 Cody Calf (voiced by Troy Davidson as a kid, Rob Paulsen as an adult in "Skull Duggery Rides Again") – nicknamed "Calf-Pint" by Moo and his posse, he idolizes the marshall and hopes to be a lawcow himself when he grows up. He is apparently related to Lily Bovine in some way and lives with her, though he does not appear to be her son. Like everyone else, he refers to her as "Miss Lily". Although well-meaning, he often gets himself into serious trouble trying to "help" the lawcows, but has been a useful asset on several occasions.
 Cowlamity Kate Cudster (voiced by Kay Lenz) – a tomboyish rancher and operator of the highly profitable Golden Cud Mine. She's as hard-working and hard-riding as any bull, and has enough skill with a lasso to put Cowlorado to shame. She returns Dakota's romantic feelings where she once gave him the hat he wears and nearly married him in "Wedding Bull Blues". In "The Fastest Filly in the West", it is revealed that Cowlamity Kate has a cousin named Cowleen. Her name is a play on that of the famous Wild West heroine Calamity Jane.
 Puma (voiced by Bill Farmer) – an unspecified rodent and resident of Cowtown who is the resident shoeshiner.
 J.R. (voiced by Michael Horse) – an Indian bison who occasionally aids Moo, Dakota and Cowlorado if the situation needs it. He tends to ramble about the scientific principles of his inventions which the C.O.W.-Boys don't want to listen to and would be asked to show them how it works.
 Tewah (voiced by Charity James) - an Indian bison in J.R.'s tribe. She is J.R.’s niece and is friends with Cody Calf
 Buffalo Bull (voiced by Jeff Bennett) – a bison who works as Cowtown's blacksmith. In the video game, he is a member of the C.O.W.-Boys. His name is a play on Buffalo Bill.
 Jack (voiced by Jim Cummings) – a rabbit who works as a telegraph operator at Cowtown.
 Gordon Boredon (voiced by Jim Cummings) – a prison warden who runs the prison containing the prisoners that the C.O.W.-Boys apprehend.

Antagonists
 Mayor Oscar Bulloney (voiced by Michael Greer) – the greedy and corrupt mayor of Cowtown in Moo Mesa, Bulloney rigs elections (as seen in "Stolen on the River") and makes taxes so high that the Masked Bull compares it to stealing. He also serves as Cowtown's crooked Justice of the Peace and Bank President.
 Sheriff Terrorbull (voiced by Joe Piscopo) – selected by the corrupt Mayor Bulloney, Terrorbull uses his sheriff's badge to conceal his evil intentions. When committing crimes, he disguises himself as the "Masked Bull" where he sports a different posture. Terrorbull was forced to leave Cowtown after losing a bet to Moo in "No Face To Hide", to see who can catch Shock Holiday and became sheriff of the remote town of Lonesome Gulch as Bulloney tells him to put up with it until he can think of a way to get him back into Cowtown. At Lonesome Gulch, Terrorbull continued his unlawful exploits whenever Mayor Bulloney is in need of the Masked Bull.
 Saddle Sore Scorpion (voiced by Jim Cummings) – a scorpion and one of the comically inept henchmen of Sheriff Terrorbull. He is slightly smarter and braver than Boot Hill Buzzard, but only just.
 Boot Hill Buzzard (voiced by Danny Mann) – a buzzard who is Sheriff Terrorbull's other comically inept henchman. As the more dim-witted of the two, he is often saddled with more than his fair share of the grunt work, especially if the job involves something embarrassing or unappealing. His name is taken from an old west slang term for a graveyard.
 Barney Finkleberg (voiced by Tim Curry) – a con artist who used the alias of Jacques La Beef.
 Horribull – Sheriff Terrorbull's criminal younger brother whom he breaks out of Sinquitten Federal Prison and has him pose as the Masked Bull in order to protect his identity after Puma saw the Masked Bull without his mask on.
 Sadie Wowcow (voiced by Michael Greer) – a former show cow who is Lily Bovine's sworn rival. In the past, she always tried to upstage Lily due to jealousy over her popularity. While working for Mayor Bulloney, she tried to get revenge by running Lily out of business in order for the mayor to claim an oil well under the Tumbleweed Saloon.
 Skull Duggery (voiced by Jim Cummings) – Tom Duggery was a mean miner who had staked his claim on Skull Mountain. He had struck silver and hid it in a secret chamber within his mine. In his second appearance, Skull Duggery planned his revenge on the C.O.W.-Boys by enlisting some ghosts from a ghost town to help him.
 Five Card Cud – a criminal who conspired to take control of the Dixie Trixie river boat.
 Short Change (voiced by Michael Gough) – five Card Cud's weasel henchman.
 Gila Hooligans – a gang who crashed Mayor Bulloney's re-election party.
 Hole in the Ground Gang – a duo of snakes. Their name is a play on the Hole in the Wall Gang.
 Bat Blastagun (voiced by Neil Ross) – a bat outlaw. He and his gang caused trouble for Miller Glen where they even bested Sheriff T-Bone. In his second appearance, Bat Blastagun and his gang escaped from prison and use a weaponized version of the comet shard as part of a plot to shrink the C.O.W.-Boys and rob Cowtown. His name is a play on Bat Masterson.
 Gil A. Monster – a gila monster who is a part of Bat Blastagun's gang.
 Rawhide - a snake member of Bat Blastagun's gang who is often seen being carried by Gil A. Monster.
 Sid Arachnid – a spider who is part of Bat Blastagun's gang. He wields a gun that shoots webs.
 Dr. Wolfgang Wolfenstein – a wolf and mad scientist who Bat Blastagun enlisted to weaponize the shard of the comet that created Moo Mesa.
 Shock Holliday (voiced by Michael Bell) – a bison outlaw and the leader of his gang who captured all the trains while demanding a ransom from the Railway President. His name is a play on Doc Holliday.
 Roy Soy Beans (voiced by Bill Farmer) – a red wolf outlaw, member of Shock Holliday's gang, and possibly his second-in-command who wields a gun that shoots. His name is a play on Judge Roy Bean.
 The Boar Brothers – a couple of wild boar outlaws and members of Shock Holliday's gang. They wield clubs in battle.
 Slick Willy Weasel (voiced by Jeff Bennett) – a weasel who is member of Shock Holliday's gang. He drives their carriage.
 Cow Belle (voiced by Ruth Buzzi) – a female outlaw. She and her three sons used Sidewinder City as a refuge for outlaws everywhere in exchange for a share of their heist. Her name is a play on Belle Starr.
 Butch Cowsidy (voiced by Pat Fraley) – Cow Belle's eldest but shortest son with a broken horn. His name is a play on Butch Cassidy.
 Lone Grunger – Cow Belle's second eldest son who dresses in a suit. His name is a play on the Lone Ranger.
 Sundazed Kid (voiced by Jeff Bennett) – Cow Belle's youngest but tallest son who is the strongest of her kids. His name is a play on the Sundance Kid.
 Longhorn Silver (voiced by Brad Garrett) – a longhorn pirate captain who leads his pirate crew in causing trouble on Moo Mesa's waterways. His name is a play on Long John Silver.
 Cacklin' Kid (voiced by Rob Paulsen) – a small coyote and known outlaw who the C.O.W.-Boys apprehend while he was being targeted by the Bayin' Bunch, whom he once rode with.
 Bayin' Bunch – a gang of coyotes who target the Cacklin' Kid who hid their loot in a graveyard.
 Scavenger – the leader of the Bayin' Bunch.
 Billy the Kidder (voiced by Charlie Adler) – a goat criminal who targeted the lost treasure of the Concudsadors. His name is a play on Billy the Kid.
 Lester (voiced by Charlie Adler) – one of Billy the Kidder's lizard henchmen.
 Kisser – one of Billy the Kidder's lizard henchmen.
 The Great Bovini (voiced by Dorian Harewood) – a ringmaster who uses a special stone called the Cowinoor Diamond to mesmerize people. As Boot Hill Buzzard was unaffected by the Cowinoor Diamond while Mayor Bulloney and Saddle Sore were, he and the C.O.W.-Boys had to work together to defeat the Great Bovini and free everyone from the mind-control.
 Barb Wire Babs (voiced by Kate Mulgrew) – Miss Barbara is the leader of an all-female gang.
 Rooster Cogsbull (voiced by Michael Bell) – a wagon master and gold thief who masquerades as a creature known as the "Cowgoyle" (a cow-type gargoyle). His name is a play on Rooster Cogburn.
 Big Bucks – a stag claim-jumper who targeted the recently discovered gold.
 Digalong – a mole and one of Big Bucks' henchman.
 Stub – a donkey and one of Big Bucks' henchman.
 Fast Willy – a dog criminal who plotted to steal Cowleen's horse Tornado as part of a bigger plot to rob the Pony Express.
 Mules Verne – a mule who plotted to steal the Dixie Trixie where the Invention Convention is so that he can force the inventors on board to build a giant robot cowboy as part of his plot to take over Moo Mesa. His name is a play on Jules Verne.

Episode guide
Several of these episodes or episode titles are parodies of popular Western films or books.

Season 1 (1992)

Season 2 (1993)

Cast
 Jeff Bennett – Cowlorado Kid, Hole in the Ground Gang Leader (in "The Big Cow Wow"), Frank (in "Another Fine Mesa"), Beans (in "Another Fine Mesa"), Slick Willy Weasel (in "No Face to Hide"), Sundazed Kid (in "The Down Under Gang")
 Jim Cummings – The Dakota Dude, Jack, Saddle Sore, Warden Gordon Borden, Wild Bill Barker, Skull Duggery (in "Legend of Skull Duggery," "Skull Duggery Rides Again"), Gila Hooligans Leader (in "Dances with Bulls"), Toupee Turkey (in "The Big Cow Wow"), Grits (in "Night of the Cowgoyle")
 Troy Davidson – Cody Calf
 Bill Farmer – Puma, Roy Soy Beans (in "No Face to Hide"), Jury Foreman (in "The Cacklin' Kid")
 Pat Fraley – Marshal Moo Montana, Butch Cowsidy (in "The Down Under Gang")
 Michael Greer – Mayor Oscar Bulloney
 Michael Horse – J.R.
 Charity James – Lily Bovine, Tewah
 Kay Lenz – Cowlamity Kate
 Danny Mann – Boot Hill Buzzard
 Joe Piscopo – Sheriff Terrorbull

Additional voices
 Charlie Adler – Billy the Kidder (in "Billy the Kidder"), Lester (in "Billy the Kidder")
 Jack Angel –
 Michael Bell – Shock Holiday (in "No Face to Hide"), Rooster Cogsbull (in "Night of the Cowgoyle")
 Robby Benson – 
 Corey Burton – 
 Ruth Buzzi – Cow Belle (in "The Down Under Gang")
 Jodi Carlisle – 
 Tim Curry – Jacques La Beef/Barney Finkleberg
 David Doyle – Rocky Bovine (in "Billy the Kidder")
 Brad Garrett – Longhorn Silver (in "Cow Pirates of Swampy Cove")
 Ellen Gerstell – 
 Michael Gough – Small Change (in "Stolen on the River")
 Mark Hamill – 
 Dorian Harewood – The Great Bovini (in "Circus Daze")
 Kate Mulgrew – Barbed Wire Babs/Miss Barbara (in "No Way to Treat a Lady")
 Rob Paulsen – Adult Cody Calf (in "Skull Duggery Rides Again"), Cacklin Kid (in "The Cacklin Kid"), Swifty Buckhorn (in "The Fastest Filly in the West")
 Stu Rosen –
 Neil Ross – Bat Blastagun (in "Another Fine Mesa" and "How the West was Shrunk")
 Kath Soucie – Carly, Jake Daffidill, Sally Sheep
 Sally Struthers – Bessy Bluebell ("in "Another Fine Mesa")
 Russi Taylor – Sally Sue Holstein (in "A Sheepful of Dollars")

Crew
 Ginny McSwain – Voice Director
 Cary Silver – Talent Coordinator

Theme song
The theme song was sung by country artist Billy Dean, who co-wrote it with Verlon Thompson.

Toys
A toy line was released by Hasbro with designs reminiscent of Playmates Toys Teenage Mutant Ninja Turtles figures.

In other media

Video game
A four-player arcade game was also released by Konami in North America and Europe on November 19, 1992. Ryan Brown worked closely with Konami on the game's development. The game is a side-scrolling run-and-gun similar to Konami's previous game, Sunset Riders.

Comic book 
In 1992–1993, Archie Comics published a three-issue limited series based on Wild West C.O.W.-Boys of Moo Mesa, which was written by Brown's long-time collaborator Doug Brammer.

Videocassette 
Twelve VHS cassettes containing episodes were released:
 Stolen on the River
 A Snake in Cow's Clothing
 School Days
 Another Fine Mesa
 Bang 'Em High
 The Big Cow-Wow
 Bulls of a Feather
 Dances with Bulls
 Legend of Skull Duggery
 A Sheepful of Dollars
 Wedding Bull Blues
 Wetward, Whoa

References

External links
 
 Official blog

1990s American animated television series
1990s American science fiction television series
1990s Western (genre) television series
1990s toys
1992 American television series debuts
1992 video games
1993 American television series endings
Action figures
American Broadcasting Company original programming
American children's animated action television series
American children's animated adventure television series
American children's animated science fantasy television series
Fictional cowboys and cowgirls
Animal superheroes
Western (genre) animated television series
Arcade video games
Arcade-only video games
English-language television shows
Hasbro products
Konami games
Run and gun games
Science fiction Westerns
Television series about cattle
Television series by DHX Media
Television series by DIC Entertainment
Television series by King World Productions
Television series by Ruby-Spears
Video games based on animated television series
Video games developed in Japan